German, or more precisely High German, is a West Germanic language mainly spoken in Western Europe and Central Europe. It is the most widely spoken and official or co-official language in Germany, Austria, Switzerland, Liechtenstein, and the Italian province of South Tyrol. It is also a co-official language of Luxembourg and Belgium, as well as a recognized national language in Namibia. 
Outside Germany, it is also spoken by German communities in France (Bas-Rhin), Czech Republic (North Bohemia), Poland (Upper Silesia), Slovakia (Bratislava Region), and Hungary (Sopron).

German is most similar to other languages within the West Germanic language branch, including Afrikaans, Dutch, English, the Frisian languages, Low German, Luxembourgish, Scots, and Yiddish. It also contains close similarities in vocabulary to some languages in the North Germanic group, such as Danish, Norwegian, and Swedish. German is the second-most widely spoken Germanic language after English, which is also a West Germanic language.

German is one of the major languages of the world. It is the most spoken native language within the European Union. German is also widely taught as a foreign language, especially in continental Europe, where it is the third most taught foreign language (after English and French), and the United States. The language has been influential in the fields of philosophy, theology, science, and technology. It is the second-most commonly used scientific language and among the most widely used languages on websites. The German-speaking countries are ranked fifth in terms of annual publication of new books, with one-tenth of all books (including e-books) in the world being published in German.

German is an inflected language, with four cases for nouns, pronouns, and adjectives (nominative, accusative, genitive, dative); three genders (masculine, feminine, neuter); and two numbers (singular, plural). It has strong and weak verbs. The majority of its vocabulary derives from the ancient Germanic branch of the Indo-European language family, while a smaller share is partly derived from Latin and Greek, along with fewer words borrowed from French and Modern English.

German is a pluricentric language; the three standardized variants are German, Austrian, and Swiss Standard High German. It is also notable for its broad spectrum of dialects, with many varieties existing in Europe and other parts of the world. Some of these non-standard varieties have become recognized and protected by regional or national governments.

Since 2004, meetings of German-speaking countries have been held annually with six participants: Germany, Austria, Belgium, Liechtenstein, Luxembourg, and Switzerland.

Classification 

German is an Indo-European language and belongs to the West Germanic group of the Germanic languages. The Germanic languages are traditionally subdivided into three branches, North Germanic, East Germanic, and West Germanic. The first of these branches survives in modern Danish, Swedish, Norwegian, Faroese, and Icelandic, all of which are descended from Old Norse. The East Germanic languages are now extinct, and Gothic is the only language in this branch which survives in written texts. The West Germanic languages, however, have undergone extensive dialectal subdivision and are now represented in modern languages such as English, German, Dutch, Yiddish, Afrikaans, and others.

Within the West Germanic language dialect continuum, the Benrath and Uerdingen lines (running through Düsseldorf-Benrath and Krefeld-Uerdingen, respectively) serve to distinguish the Germanic dialects that were affected by the High German consonant shift (south of Benrath) from those that were not (north of Uerdingen). The various regional dialects spoken south of these lines are grouped as High German dialects, while those spoken to the north comprise the Low German/Low Saxon and Low Franconian dialects. As members of the West Germanic language family, High German, Low German, and Low Franconian have been proposed to be further distinguished historically as Irminonic, Ingvaeonic, and Istvaeonic, respectively. This classification indicates their historical descent from dialects spoken by the Irminones (also known as the Elbe group), Ingvaeones (or North Sea Germanic group), and Istvaeones (or Weser-Rhine group).

Standard German is based on a combination of Thuringian-Upper Saxon and Upper Franconian dialects, which are Central German and Upper German dialects belonging to the High German dialect group. German is therefore closely related to the other languages based on High German dialects, such as Luxembourgish (based on Central Franconian dialects) and Yiddish. Also closely related to Standard German are the Upper German dialects spoken in the southern German-speaking countries, such as Swiss German (Alemannic dialects) and the various Germanic dialects spoken in the French region of Grand Est, such as Alsatian (mainly Alemannic, but also CentralandUpper Franconian dialects) and Lorraine Franconian (Central Franconian).

After these High German dialects, standard German is less closely related to languages based on Low Franconian dialects (e.g., Dutch and Afrikaans), Low German or Low Saxon dialects (spoken in northern Germany and southern Denmark), neither of which underwent the High German consonant shift. As has been noted, the former of these dialect types is Istvaeonic and the latter Ingvaeonic, whereas the High German dialects are all Irminonic; the differences between these languages and standard German are therefore considerable. Also related to German are the Frisian languages—North Frisian (spoken in Nordfriesland), Saterland Frisian (spoken in Saterland), and West Frisian (spoken in Friesland)—as well as the Anglic languages of English and Scots. These Anglo-Frisian dialects did not take part in the High German consonant shift, and the Anglic languages also adopted much vocabulary from both Old Norse and the Norman language.

History

Old High German 

The history of the German language begins with the High German consonant shift during the Migration Period, which separated Old High German dialects from Old Saxon. This sound shift involved a drastic change in the pronunciation of both voiced and voiceless stop consonants (b, d, g, and p, t, k, respectively). The primary effects of the shift were the following below.
 Voiceless stops became long (geminated) voiceless fricatives following a vowel;
 Voiceless stops became affricates in word-initial position, or following certain consonants;
 Voiced stops became voiceless in certain phonetic settings.

While there is written evidence of the Old High German language in several Elder Futhark inscriptions from as early as the sixth century AD (such as the Pforzen buckle), the Old High German period is generally seen as beginning with the Abrogans (written ), a Latin-German glossary supplying over 3,000 Old High German words with their Latin equivalents. The Muspilli is a Christian poem written in a Bavarian dialect offering an account of the soul after the Last Judgment, and the Merseburg charms are transcriptions of spells and charms from the pagan Germanic tradition. Linguistically, this text is highly interesting due to the mixed use of Old Saxon and Old High German dialects in its composition. The written works of this period stem mainly from the Alamanni, Bavarian, and Thuringian groups, all belonging to the Elbe Germanic group (Irminones), which had settled in what is now southern-central Germany and Austria between the second and sixth centuries, during the great migration.

In general, the surviving texts of Old High German (OHG) show a wide range of dialectal diversity with very little written uniformity. The early written tradition of OHG survived mostly through monasteries and scriptoria as local translations of Latin originals; as a result, the surviving texts are written in highly disparate regional dialects and exhibit significant Latin influence, particularly in vocabulary. At this point monasteries, where most written works were produced, were dominated by Latin, and German saw only occasional use in official and ecclesiastical writing.

The German language through the OHG period was still predominantly a spoken language, with a wide range of dialects and a much more extensive oral tradition than a written one. Having just emerged from the High German consonant shift, OHG was also a relatively new and volatile language still undergoing a number of phonetic, phonological, morphological, and syntactic changes. The scarcity of written work, instability of the language, and widespread illiteracy of the time explain the lack of standardization up to the end of the OHG period in 1050.

Middle High German

While there is no complete agreement over the dates of the Middle High German (MHG) period, it is generally seen as lasting from 1050 to 1350. This was a period of significant expansion of the geographical territory occupied by Germanic tribes, and consequently of the number of German speakers. Whereas during the Old High German period the Germanic tribes extended only as far east as the Elbe and Saale rivers, the MHG period saw a number of these tribes expanding beyond this eastern boundary into Slavic territory (known as the ). With the increasing wealth and geographic spread of the Germanic groups came greater use of German in the courts of nobles as the standard language of official proceedings and literature.  A clear example of this is the  employed in the Hohenstaufen court in Swabia as a standardized supra-dialectal written language. While these efforts were still regionally bound, German began to be used in place of Latin for certain official purposes, leading to a greater need for regularity in written conventions.

While the major changes of the MHG period were socio-cultural, High German was still undergoing significant linguistic changes in syntax, phonetics, and morphology as well (e.g. diphthongization of certain vowel sounds:  (OHG & MHG "house")→ (regionally in later MHG)→ (NHG), and weakening of unstressed short vowels to schwa [ə]:  (OHG "days")→ (MHG)).

A great wealth of texts survives from the MHG period. Significantly, these texts include a number of impressive secular works, such as the Nibelungenlied, an epic poem telling the story of the dragon-slayer Siegfried, and the Iwein, an Arthurian verse poem by Hartmann von Aue, lyric poems, and courtly romances such as Parzival and Tristan. The abundance and especially the secular character of the literature of the MHG period demonstrate the beginnings of a standardized written form of German, as well as the desire of poets and authors to be understood by individuals on supra-dialectal terms.

The Middle High German period is generally seen as ending when the 134653 Black Death decimated Europe's population.

Early New High German

Modern High German begins with the Early New High German (ENHG) period, which the influential German philologist Wilhelm Scherer dates 13501650, terminating with the end of the Thirty Years' War. This period saw the further displacement of Latin by German as the primary language of courtly proceedings and, increasingly, of literature in the German states. While these states were still part of the Holy Roman Empire, and far from any form of unification, the desire for a cohesive written language that would be understandable across the many German-speaking principalities and kingdoms was stronger than ever. As a spoken language German remained highly fractured throughout this period, with a vast number of often mutually incomprehensible regional dialects being spoken throughout the German states; the invention of the printing press  and the publication of Luther's vernacular translation of the Bible in 1534, however, had an immense effect on standardizing German as a supra-dialectal written language.

The ENHG period saw the rise of several important cross-regional forms of chancery German, one being , used in the court of the Holy Roman Emperor Maximilian I, and the other being , used in the Electorate of Saxony in the Duchy of Saxe-Wittenberg.

Alongside these courtly written standards, the invention of the printing press led to the development of a number of printers' languages aimed at making printed material readable and understandable across as many diverse dialects of German as possible. The greater ease of production and increased availability of written texts brought about increased standardization in the written form of German.

One of the central events in the development of ENHG was the publication of Luther's translation of the Bible into High German (the New Testament was published in 1522; the Old Testament was published in parts and completed in 1534). Copies of Luther's Bible featured a long list of glosses for each region, translating words which were unknown in the region into the regional dialect. Luther said the following concerning his translation method: Luther's translation of the Bible into High German was also decisive for the German language and its evolution from Early New High German to Modern Standard German. The publication of Luther's Bible was a decisive moment in the spread of literacy in early modern Germany, and promoted the development of non-local forms of language and exposed all speakers to forms of German from outside their own area. With Luther's rendering of the Bible in the vernacular, German asserted itself against the dominance of Latin as a legitimate language for courtly, literary, and now ecclesiastical subject-matter. His Bible was ubiquitous in the German states: nearly every household possessed a copy. Nevertheless, even with the influence of Luther's Bible as an unofficial written standard, a widely accepted standard for written German did not appear until the middle of the eighteenth century.

Habsburg Empire

German was the language of commerce and government in the Habsburg Empire, which encompassed a large area of Central and Eastern Europe. Until the mid-nineteenth century, it was essentially the language of townspeople throughout most of the Empire. Its use indicated that the speaker was a merchant or someone from an urban area, regardless of nationality.

Prague and Budapest (Buda), to name two examples, were gradually Germanized in the years after their incorporation into the Habsburg domain; others, like Pressburg (now Bratislava), were originally settled during the Habsburg period and were primarily German at that time. Prague, Budapest, Bratislava, and cities like Zagreb or Ljubljana, contained significant German minorities.

Standardization 
In 1901, the Second Orthographic Conference ended with a complete standardization of the Standard High German language in its written form, and the Duden Handbook was declared its standard definition.

The  had established conventions for German pronunciation in theatres, three years earlier; however, this was an artificial standard that did not correspond to any traditional spoken dialect. Rather, it was based on the pronunciation of Standard High German in Northern Germany, although it was subsequently regarded often as a general prescriptive norm, despite differing pronunciation traditions especially in the Upper-German-speaking regions that still characterise the dialect of the area todayespecially the pronunciation of the ending  as [ɪk] instead of [ɪç]. In Northern Germany, Standard German was a foreign language to most inhabitants, whose native dialects were subsets of Low German. It was usually encountered only in writing or formal speech; in fact, most of Standard High German was a written language, not identical to any spoken dialect, throughout the German-speaking area until well into the 19th century.

Official revisions of some of the rules from 1901 were not issued until the controversial German orthography reform of 1996 was made the official standard by governments of all German-speaking countries. Media and written works are now almost all produced in Standard High German which is understood in all areas where German is spoken.

Geographical distribution 

As a result of the German diaspora, as well as the popularity of German taught as a foreign language, the geographical distribution of German speakers (or "Germanophones") spans all inhabited continents.

However, an exact, global number of native German speakers is complicated by the existence of several varieties whose status as separate "languages" or "dialects" is disputed for political and linguistic reasons, including quantitatively strong varieties like certain forms of Alemannic and Low German. With the inclusion or exclusion of certain varieties, it is estimated that approximately 9095 million people speak German as a first language, 1025million speak it as a second language, and 75100million as a foreign language. This would imply the existence of approximately 175220million German speakers worldwide.

Europe 

, about 90million people, or 16% of the European Union's population, spoke German as their mother tongue, making it the second-most widely spoken language on the continent after Russian and the second biggest language in terms of overall speakers (after English), as well as the most spoken native language.

German Sprachraum
The area in central Europe where the majority of the population speaks German as a first language and has German as a (co-)official language is called the "German Sprachraum". German is the official language of the following countries:
 Germany 
 Austria 
 17 cantons of Switzerland
 Liechtenstein

German is a co-official language of the following countries:
 Belgium (as majority language only in the German-speaking Community, which represents 0.7% of the Belgian population)
 Luxembourg, along with French and Luxembourgish
 Switzerland, co-official at the federal level with French, Italian, and Romansh, and at the local level in four cantons: Bern (with French), Fribourg (with French), Grisons (with Italian and Romansh) and Valais (with French)
 Italy, (as majority language only in the Autonomous Province of South Tyrol, which represents 0.6% of the Italian population)

Outside the German Sprachraum
Although expulsions and (forced) assimilation after the two World wars greatly diminished them, minority communities of mostly bilingual German native speakers exist in areas both adjacent to and detached from the Sprachraum.

Within Europe, German is a recognized minority language in the following countries:
 Czech Republic (see also: Germans in the Czech Republic)
 Denmark (see also: North Schleswig Germans)
 Hungary (see also: Germans of Hungary)
 Poland (see also German minority in Poland; German is an auxiliary and co-official language in 31 communes)
 Romania (see also: Germans of Romania)
 Russia (see also: Germans in Russia)
 Slovakia (see also: Carpathian Germans)

In France, the High German varieties of Alsatian and Moselle Franconian are identified as "regional languages", but the European Charter for Regional or Minority Languages of 1998 has not yet been ratified by the government.

Africa

Cameroon

Cameroon was a colony of the German Empire from 1884 to 1916. German has nowadays almost entirely yielded to its two successors, French and English. However, as a foreign language subject German still enjoys huge popularity among pupils and students, with 300,000 people learning or speaking German in Cameroon in 2010. Today Cameroon is one of the African countries with the highest number of people with knowledge of German. However, this popularity seems to decrease over time.

Namibia

Namibia also was a colony of the German Empire, from 1884 to 1915. About 30,000 people still speak German as a native tongue today, mostly descendants of German colonial settlers. The period of German colonialism in Namibia also led to the evolution of a Standard German-based pidgin language called "Namibian Black German", which became a second language for parts of the indigenous population. Although it is nearly extinct today, some older Namibians still have some knowledge of it.

German remained a de facto official language of Namibia after the end of German colonial rule alongside English and Afrikaans, and had de jure co-official status from 1984 until its independence from South Africa in 1990. However, the Namibian government perceived Afrikaans and German as symbols of apartheid and colonialism, and decided English would be the sole official language upon independence, stating that it was a "neutral" language as there were virtually no English native speakers in Namibia at that time. German, Afrikaans, and several indigenous languages thus became "national languages" by law, identifying them as elements of the cultural heritage of the nation and ensuring that the state acknowledged and supported their presence in the country.

Today, Namibia is considered to be the only German-speaking country outside of the Sprachraum in Europe. German is used in a wide variety of spheres throughout the country, especially in business, tourism, and public signage, as well as in education, churches (most notably the German-speaking Evangelical Lutheran Church in Namibia (GELK)), other cultural spheres such as music, and media (such as German language radio programs by the Namibian Broadcasting Corporation). The  is one of the three biggest newspapers in Namibia and the only German-language daily in Africa.

South Africa
An estimated 12,000 people speak German or a German variety as a first language in South Africa, mostly originating from different waves of immigration during the 19th and 20th centuries. One of the largest communities consists of the speakers of "Nataler Deutsch", a variety of Low German concentrated in and around Wartburg. The South African constitution identifies German as a "commonly used" language and the Pan South African Language Board is obligated to promote and ensure respect for it.

North America

In the United States, German is the fifth most spoken language in terms of native and second language speakers after English, Spanish, French, and Chinese (with figures for Cantonese and Mandarin combined), with over 1 million total speakers. In the states of North Dakota and South Dakota, German is the most common language spoken at home after English. As a legacy of significant German immigration to the country, German geographical names can be found throughout the Midwest region, such as New Ulm and Bismarck (North Dakota's state capital), plus many other regions.

A number of German varieties have developed in the country and are still spoken today, such as Pennsylvania Dutch and Texas German.

South America

In Brazil, the largest concentrations of German speakers are in the states of Rio Grande do Sul (where Riograndenser Hunsrückisch developed), Santa Catarina, and Espírito Santo.

German dialects (namely Hunsrik and East Pomeranian) are recognized languages in the following municipalities in Brazil: 
 Espírito Santo (statewide cultural language): Domingos Martins, Laranja da Terra, Pancas, Santa Maria de Jetibá, Vila Pavão
 Rio Grande do Sul (Riograndenser Hunsrückisch German is a designated cultural language in the state): Santa Maria do Herval, Canguçu
 Santa Catarina: Antônio Carlos, Pomerode (standard German recognized)

Small concentrations of German-speakers and their descendants are also found in Argentina, Chile, Paraguay, Venezuela, and Bolivia.

Oceania
In Australia, the state of South Australia experienced a pronounced wave of Prussian immigration in the 1840s (particularly from Silesia region). With the prolonged isolation from other German speakers and contact with Australian English, a unique dialect known as Barossa German developed, spoken predominantly in the Barossa Valley near Adelaide. Usage of German sharply declined with the advent of World War I, due to the prevailing anti-German sentiment in the population and related government action. It continued to be used as a first language into the 20th century, but its use is now limited to a few older speakers.

As of the 2013 census, 36,642 people in New Zealand spoke German, mostly descendants of a small wave of 19th century German immigrants, making it the third most spoken European language after English and French and overall the ninth most spoken language.

A German creole named  was historically spoken in the former German colony of German New Guinea, modern day Papua New Guinea. It is at a high risk of extinction, with only about 100 speakers remaining, and a topic of interest among linguists seeking to revive interest in the language.

As a foreign language

Like English, French, and Spanish, German has become a standard foreign language throughout the world, especially in the Western World. German ranks second on par with French among the best known foreign languages in the European Union (EU) after English, as well as in Russia, and Turkey. In terms of student numbers across all levels of education, German ranks third in the EU (after English and French) and in the United States (after Spanish and French). In 2020, approximately 15.4million people were enrolled in learning German across all levels of education worldwide. This number has decreased from a peak of 20.1million in 2000. Within the EU, not counting countries where it is an official language, German as a foreign language is most popular in Eastern and Northern Europe, namely the Czech Republic, Croatia, Denmark, the Netherlands, Slovakia, Hungary, Slovenia, Sweden, Poland, and Bosnia and Herzegovina. German was once, and to some extent still is, a lingua franca in those parts of Europe.

Phonology

Consonants 
With around 22 to 26 phonemes, the German consonant system has an average number of consonants in comparison with other languages. One of the more noteworthy ones is the unusual affricate .

Vowels 

With 15 monophthongal vowel phonemes in stressed syllables, the vowel system is unusually large. The vowels /ə/ and /ɐ/ (occurring in unstressed syllables only) are not seen as vowel phonemes by all scholars. Diphthongs /aɪ, aʊ, ɔʏ/ are also often listed as vowel phonemes.

Standard High German

The basis of Standard High German developed with the Luther Bible and the chancery language spoken by the Saxon court. However, there are places where the traditional regional dialects have been replaced by new vernaculars based on Standard High German; that is the case in large stretches of Northern Germany but also in major cities in other parts of the country. It is important to note, however, that the colloquial Standard High German differs from the formal written language, especially in grammar and syntax, in which it has been influenced by dialectal speech.

Standard High German differs regionally among German-speaking countries in vocabulary and some instances of pronunciation and even grammar and orthography. This variation must not be confused with the variation of local dialects. Even though the regional varieties of Standard High German are only somewhat influenced by the local dialects, they are very distinct. Standard High German is thus considered a pluricentric language.

In most regions, the speakers use a continuum from more dialectal varieties to more standard varieties depending on the circumstances.

Varieties

In German linguistics, German dialects are distinguished from varieties of Standard High German.
The varieties of Standard High German refer to the different local varieties of the pluricentric Standard High German. They differ only slightly in lexicon and phonology. In certain regions, they have replaced the traditional German dialects, especially in Northern Germany.
 German Standard German
 Austrian Standard German
 Swiss Standard German

In the German-speaking parts of Switzerland, mixtures of dialect and standard are very seldom used, and the use of Standard High German is largely restricted to the written language. About 11% of the Swiss residents speak Standard High German at home, but this is mainly due to German immigrants. This situation has been called a medial diglossia. Swiss Standard German is used in the Swiss education system, while Austrian German is officially used in the Austrian education system.

Dialects

The German dialects are the traditional local varieties of the language; many of them are not mutually intelligible with standard German, and they have great differences in lexicon, phonology, and syntax. If a narrow definition of language based on mutual intelligibility is used, many German dialects are considered to be separate languages (for instance in the Ethnologue). However, such a point of view is unusual in German linguistics.

The German dialect continuum is traditionally divided most broadly into High German and Low German, also called Low Saxon. However, historically, High German dialects and Low Saxon/Low German dialects do not belong to the same language. Nevertheless, in today's Germany, Low Saxon/Low German is often perceived as a dialectal variation of Standard German on a functional level even by many native speakers.

The variation among the German dialects is considerable, with often only neighbouring dialects being mutually intelligible. Some dialects are not intelligible to people who know only Standard German. However, all German dialects belong to the dialect continuum of High German and Low Saxon.

Low German or Low Saxon

Middle Low German was the lingua franca of the Hanseatic League. It was the predominant language in Northern Germany until the 16th century. In 1534, the Luther Bible was published. It aimed to be understandable to a broad audience and was based mainly on Central and Upper German varieties. The Early New High German language gained more prestige than Low German and became the language of science and literature. Around the same time, the Hanseatic League, a confederation of northern ports, lost its importance as new trade routes to Asia and the Americas were established, and the most powerful German states of that period were located in Middle and Southern Germany.

The 18th and 19th centuries were marked by mass education in Standard German in schools. Gradually, Low German came to be politically viewed as a mere dialect spoken by the uneducated. The proportion of the population who can understand and speak it has decreased continuously since World War II.
The major cities in the Low German area are Hamburg, Hanover, Bremen and Dortmund.

Sometimes, Low Saxon and Low Franconian varieties are grouped together because both are unaffected by the High German consonant shift.

Low Franconian

In Germany, Low Franconian dialects are spoken in the northwest of North Rhine-Westphalia, along the Lower Rhine. The Low Franconian dialects spoken in Germany are referred to as Low Rhenish. In the north of the German Low Franconian language area, North Low Franconian dialects (also referred to as Cleverlands or as dialects of South Guelderish) are spoken. The South Low Franconian and Bergish dialects, which are spoken in the south of the German Low Franconian language area, are transitional dialects between Low Franconian and Ripuarian dialects.

The Low Franconian dialects fall within a linguistic category used to classify a number of historical and contemporary West Germanic varieties most closely related to, and including, the Dutch language. Consequently, the vast majority of the Low Franconian dialects are spoken outside of the German language area, in the Netherlands and Belgium. During the Middle Ages and Early Modern Period, the Low Franconian dialects now spoken in Germany, used Middle Dutch or Early Modern Dutch as their literary language and Dachsprache. Following a 19th-century change in Prussian language policy, use of Dutch as an official and public language was forbidden; resulting in Standard German taking its place as the region's official language. As a result, these dialects are now considered German dialects from a socio-linguistic point of view. Nevertheless, topologically these dialects are structurally and phonologically far more similar to Dutch, than to German and form both the smallest and most divergent dialect cluster within the contemporary German language area.

High German

The High German dialects consist of the Central German, High Franconian and Upper German dialects. The High Franconian dialects are transitional dialects between Central and Upper German. The High German varieties spoken by the Ashkenazi Jews have several unique features and are considered as a separate language, Yiddish, written with the Hebrew alphabet.

Central German
The Central German dialects are spoken in Central Germany, from Aachen in the west to Görlitz in the east. They consist of Franconian dialects in the west (West Central German) and non-Franconian dialects in the east (East Central German). Modern Standard German is mostly based on Central German dialects.

The Franconian, West Central German dialects are the Central Franconian dialects (Ripuarian and Moselle Franconian) and the Rhine Franconian dialects (Hessian and Palatine). These dialects are considered as
 German in Germany and Belgium
 Luxembourgish in Luxembourg
 Lorraine Franconian (spoken in Moselle) and as a Rhine Franconian variant of Alsatian (spoken in Alsace bossue only) in France
 Limburgish or Kerkrade dialect in the Netherlands.
Luxembourgish as well as the Transylvanian Saxon dialect spoken in Transylvania are based on Moselle Franconian dialects. The major cities in the Franconian Central German area are Cologne and Frankfurt.

Further east, the non-Franconian, East Central German dialects are spoken (Thuringian, Upper Saxon and North Upper Saxon-South Markish, and earlier, in the then German-speaking parts of Silesia also Silesian, and in then German southern East Prussia also High Prussian).
The major cities in the East Central German area are Berlin and Leipzig.

High Franconian
The High Franconian dialects are transitional dialects between Central and Upper German. They consist of the East and South Franconian dialects.

The East Franconian dialect branch is one of the most spoken dialect branches in Germany. These dialects are spoken in the region of Franconia and in the central parts of Saxon Vogtland. Franconia consists of the Bavarian districts of Upper, Middle, and Lower Franconia, the region of South Thuringia (Thuringia), and the eastern parts of the region of Heilbronn-Franken (Tauber Franconia and Hohenlohe) in Baden-Württemberg.
The major cities in the East Franconian area are Nuremberg and Würzburg.

South Franconian is mainly spoken in northern Baden-Württemberg in Germany, but also in the northeasternmost part of the region of Alsace in France. In Baden-Württemberg, they are considered as dialects of German.
The major cities in the South Franconian area are Karlsruhe and Heilbronn.

Upper German

The Upper German dialects are the Alemannic and Swabian dialects in the west and the Bavarian dialects in the east.

Alemannic and Swabian
Alemannic dialects are spoken in Switzerland (High Alemannic in the densely populated Swiss Plateau, in the south also Highest Alemannic, and Low Alemannic in Basel), Baden-Württemberg (Swabian and Low Alemannic, in the southwest also High Alemannic), Bavarian Swabia (Swabian, in the southwesternmost part also Low Alemannic), Vorarlberg (Low, High, and Highest Alemannic), Alsace (Low Alemannic, in the southernmost part also High Alemannic), Liechtenstein (High and Highest Alemannic), and in the Tyrolean district of Reutte (Swabian). The Alemannic dialects are considered as Alsatian in Alsace.
The major cities in the Alemannic area are Stuttgart, Freiburg, Basel, Zürich, Lucerne and Bern.

Bavarian
Bavarian dialects are spoken in Austria (Vienna, Lower and Upper Austria, Styria, Carinthia, Salzburg, Burgenland, and in most parts of Tyrol), Bavaria (Upper and Lower Bavaria as well as Upper Palatinate), South Tyrol, southwesternmost Saxony (Southern Vogtländisch), and in the Swiss village of Samnaun.
The major cities in the Bavarian area are Vienna, Munich, Salzburg, Regensburg, Graz and Bolzano.

Regiolects
 Berlinian, the High German regiolect or dialect of Berlin with Low German substrate
 Missingsch, a Low-German-coloured variety of High German.
 Ruhrdeutsch (Ruhr German), the High German regiolect of the Ruhr area.

Grammar

German is a fusional language with a moderate degree of inflection, with three grammatical genders; as such, there can be a large number of words derived from the same root.

Noun inflection

German nouns inflect by case, gender, and number:
 four cases: nominative, accusative, genitive, and dative.
 three genders: masculine, feminine, and neuter. Others are more variable, sometimes depending on the region in which the language is spoken.
 two numbers: singular and plural.

This degree of inflection is considerably less than in Old High German and other old Indo-European languages such as Latin, Ancient Greek, and Sanskrit, and it is also somewhat less than, for instance, Old English, modern Icelandic, or Russian. The three genders have collapsed in the plural. With four cases and three genders plus plural, there are 16 permutations of case and gender/number of the article (not the nouns), but there are only six forms of the definite article, which together cover all 16 permutations. In nouns, inflection for case is required in the singular for strong masculine and neuter nouns only in the genitive and in the dative (only in fixed or archaic expressions), and even this is losing ground to substitutes in informal speech. Weak masculine nouns share a common case ending for genitive, dative, and accusative in the singular. Feminine nouns are not declined in the singular. The plural has an inflection for the dative. In total, seven inflectional endings (not counting plural markers) exist in German: .

Like the other Germanic languages, German forms noun compounds in which the first noun modifies the category given by the second:  ("dog hut"; specifically: "dog kennel"). Unlike English, whose newer compounds or combinations of longer nouns are often written "open" with separating spaces, German (like some other Germanic languages) nearly always uses the "closed" form without spaces, for example:  ("tree house"). Like English, German allows arbitrarily long compounds in theory (see also English compounds). However, examples like this are perceived by native speakers as excessively bureaucratic, stylistically awkward, or even satirical.

Verb inflection

The inflection of standard German verbs includes:
 two main conjugation classes: weak and strong (as in English). Additionally, there is a third class, known as mixed verbs, whose conjugation combines features of both the strong and weak patterns.
 three persons: first, second and third.
 two numbers: singular and plural.
 three moods: indicative, imperative and subjunctive (in addition to infinitive).
 two voices: active and passive. The passive voice uses auxiliary verbs and is divisible into static and dynamic. Static forms show a constant state and use the verb to be (sein). Dynamic forms show an action and use the verb to become (werden).
 two tenses without auxiliary verbs (present and preterite) and four tenses constructed with auxiliary verbs (perfect, pluperfect, future and future perfect).
 the distinction between grammatical aspects is rendered by combined use of the subjunctive or preterite marking so the plain indicative voice uses neither of those two markers; the subjunctive by itself often conveys reported speech; subjunctive plus preterite marks the conditional state; and the preterite alone shows either plain indicative (in the past), or functions as a (literal) alternative for either reported speech or the conditional state of the verb, when necessary for clarity.
 the distinction between perfect and progressive aspect is and has, at every stage of development, been a productive category of the older language and in nearly all documented dialects, but strangely enough it is now rigorously excluded from written usage in its present normalised form.
 disambiguation of completed vs. uncompleted forms is widely observed and regularly generated by common prefixes ( [to look],  [to see – unrelated form: ]).

Verb prefixes
The meaning of basic verbs can be expanded and sometimes radically changed through the use of a number of prefixes.

Other examples include the following:
 (to stick),  (to detain);  (to buy),  (to sell);  (to hear),  (to cease);  (to drive),  (to experience).

Many German verbs have a separable prefix, often with an adverbial function. In finite verb forms, it is split off and moved to the end of the clause and is hence considered by some to be a "resultative particle". For example, meaning "to go along", would be split, giving  (Literal: "Go you with?"; Idiomatic: "Are you going along?").

Indeed, several parenthetical clauses may occur between the prefix of a finite verb and its complement (ankommen = to arrive, er kam an = he arrived, er ist angekommen = he has arrived):
 
A selectively literal translation of this example to illustrate the point might look like this:
 He "came" on Friday evening, after a hard day at work and the usual annoyances that had time and again been troubling him for years now at his workplace, with questionable joy, to a meal which, as he hoped, his wife had already put on the table, finally home "to".

Word order
German word order is generally with the V2 word order restriction and also with the SOV word order restriction for main clauses. For yes-no questions, exclamations, and wishes, the finite verb always has the first position. In subordinate clauses, the verb occurs at the very end.

German requires a verbal element (main verb or auxiliary verb) to appear second in the sentence. The verb is preceded by the topic of the sentence. The element in focus appears at the end of the sentence. For a sentence without an auxiliary, these are several possibilities:

  (The old man gave me yesterday the book; normal order)
  (The book gave [to] me yesterday the old man)
  (The book gave the old man [to] me yesterday)
  (The book gave [to] me the old man yesterday)
  (Yesterday gave [to] me the old man the book, normal order)
  ([To] me gave the old man the book yesterday (entailing: as for someone else, it was another date))

The position of a noun in a German sentence has no bearing on its being a subject, an object or another argument. In a declarative sentence in English, if the subject does not occur before the predicate, the sentence could well be misunderstood.

However, German's flexible word order allows one to emphasise specific words:

Normal word order:
 
 The manager entered yesterday at 10 o'clock with an umbrella in the hand his office.

Second variant in normal word order:
 
 The manager entered his office yesterday at 10 o'clock with an umbrella in the hand.
 This variant accentuates the time specification and that he carried an umbrella.

Object in front:
 
 His office entered the manager yesterday at 10 o'clock with an umbrella in the hand.
 The object  (his office) is thus highlighted; it could be the topic of the next sentence.

Adverb of time in front:
 
 Yesterday entered the manager at 10 o'clock with an umbrella in the hand his office. (but today without umbrella)

Both time expressions in front:
 .
 Yesterday at 10 o'clock entered the manager with an umbrella in the hand his office.
 The full-time specification  is highlighted.

Another possibility:
 .
 Yesterday at 10 o'clock entered the manager his office with an umbrella in the hand.
 Both the time specification and the fact he carried an umbrella are accentuated.

Swapped adverbs:
 
 The manager entered with an umbrella in the hand yesterday at 10 o'clock his office.
 The phrase  is highlighted.

Swapped object:
 
 The manager entered yesterday at 10 o'clock his office with an umbrella in the hand.
 The time specification and the object  (his office) are lightly accentuated.

The flexible word order also allows one to use language "tools" (such as poetic meter and figures of speech) more freely.

Auxiliary verbs
When an auxiliary verb is present, it appears in second position, and the main verb appears at the end. This occurs notably in the creation of the perfect tense. Many word orders are still possible:

 (The old man has me today the book given.)
 (The book has the old man me today given.)
 (Today has the old man me the book given.)

The main verb may appear in first position to put stress on the action itself. The auxiliary verb is still in second position.

 (Given has me the old man the book today.) The bare fact that the book has been given is emphasized, as well as 'today'.

Modal verbs
Sentences using modal verbs place the infinitive at the end. For example, the English sentence "Should he go home?" would be rearranged in German to say "Should he (to) home go?". Thus, in sentences with several subordinate or relative clauses, the infinitives are clustered at the end. Compare the similar clustering of prepositions in the following (highly contrived) English sentence: "What did you bring that book that I do not like to be read to out of up for?"

Multiple infinitives
German subordinate clauses have all verbs clustered at the end. Given that auxiliaries encode future, passive, modality, and the perfect, very long chains of verbs at the end of the sentence can occur.

 V psv perf mod
 One suspects that the deserter probably shot become be should.
 ("It is suspected that the deserter probably had been shot")

 
 He knew not that the agent a picklock had make let
 
 He knew not that the agent a picklock make let had
 ("He did not know that the agent had had a picklock made")

The order at the end of such strings is subject to variation, but the second one in the last example is unusual.

Vocabulary 

Most German vocabulary is derived from the Germanic branch of the Indo-European language family. However, there is a significant amount of loanwords from other languages, in particular Latin, Greek, Italian, French, and most recently English. In the early 19th century, Joachim Heinrich Campe estimated that one fifth of the total German vocabulary was of French or Latin origin.

Latin words were already imported into the predecessor of the German language during the Roman Empire and underwent all the characteristic phonetic changes in German. Their origin is thus no longer recognizable for most speakers (e.g. Borrowing from Latin continued after the fall of the Roman Empire during Christianisation, mediated by the church and monasteries. Another important influx of Latin words can be observed during Renaissance humanism. In a scholarly context, the borrowings from Latin have continued until today, in the last few decades often indirectly through borrowings from English. During the 15th to 17th centuries, the influence of Italian was great, leading to many Italian loanwords in the fields of architecture, finance and music. The influence of the French language in the 17th to 19th centuries resulted in an even greater import of French words. The English influence was already present in the 19th century, but it did not become dominant until the second half of the 20th century.

Thus, Notker Labeo was able to translate Aristotelian treatises into pure (Old High) German in the decades after the year 1000. The tradition of loan translation was revitalized in the 17th and 18th century with poets like Philipp von Zesen or linguists like Joachim Heinrich Campe, who introduced close to 300 words that are still used in modern German. Even today, there are movements that promote the substitution of foreign words that are deemed unnecessary with German alternatives.

As in English, there are many pairs of synonyms due to the enrichment of the Germanic vocabulary with loanwords from Latin and Latinized Greek. These words often have different connotations from their Germanic counterparts and are usually perceived as more scholarly.
  – "history, historical",
  – "humaneness, humane",
  – "millennium",
  – "perception",
  – "vocabulary",
  – "dictionary, wordbook",
  – "to try",
  – "to propose",

The size of the vocabulary of German is difficult to estimate. The  (German Dictionary), initiated by the Brothers Grimm (Jacob and Wilhelm Grimm) and the most comprehensive guide to the vocabulary of the German language, already contained over 330,000 headwords in its first edition. The modern German scientific vocabulary is estimated at nine million words and word groups (based on the analysis of 35 million sentences of a corpus in Leipzig, which as of July 2003 included 500million words in total).

The Duden is the de facto official dictionary of the Standard High German language, first published by Konrad Duden in 1880. The Duden is updated regularly, with new editions appearing every four or five years. , it was in its 27th edition and in 12 volumes, each covering different aspects such as loanwords, etymology, pronunciation, synonyms, and so forth.The first of these volumes,  (German Orthography), has long been the prescriptive source for the spelling of German. The Duden had become the bible of the German language, being the definitive set of rules regarding grammar, spelling, and usage of German.

The  ("Austrian Dictionary"), abbreviated , is the official dictionary of the German language in the Republic of Austria. It is edited by a group of linguists under the authority of the Austrian Federal Ministry of Education, Arts and Culture. It is the Austrian counterpart to the German Duden and contains a number of terms unique to Austrian German or more frequently used or differently pronounced there. A considerable amount of this "Austrian" vocabulary is also common in Southern Germany, especially Bavaria, and some of it is used in Switzerland as well. Since the 39th edition in 2001 the orthography of the  has been adjusted to the German spelling reform of 1996. The dictionary is also officially used in the Italian province of South Tyrol.

Orthography

Written texts in German are easily recognisable as such by distinguishing features such as umlauts and certain orthographical features– German is the only major language that capitalizes all nouns, a relic of a widespread practice in Northern Europe in the early modern era (including English for a while, into the 1700s)– and the frequent occurrence of long compounds. Because legibility and convenience set certain boundaries, compounds consisting of more than three or four nouns are almost exclusively found in humorous contexts. (English also can string nouns together, though it usually separates the nouns with spaces: as, for example, "toilet bowl cleaner".)

In German orthography, nouns are capitalised, which makes it easier for readers to determine the function of a word within a sentence. This convention is almost unique to German today (shared perhaps only by the closely related Luxembourgish language and several insular dialects of the North Frisian language), but it was historically common in other languages such as Danish (which abolished the capitalization of nouns in 1948) and English.

Present
Before the German orthography reform of 1996, ß replaced ss after long vowels and diphthongs and before consonants, word-, or partial-word endings. In reformed spelling, ß replaces ss only after long vowels and diphthongs.

Since there is no traditional capital form of ß, it was replaced by SS (or SZ) when capitalization was required. For example,  (tape measure) became  in capitals. An exception was the use of ß in legal documents and forms when capitalizing names. To avoid confusion with similar names, lower case ß was sometimes maintained (thus "" instead of ""). Capital ß (ẞ) was ultimately adopted into German orthography in 2017, ending a long orthographic debate (thus " and ").

Umlaut vowels (ä, ö, ü) are commonly transcribed with ae, oe, and ue if the umlauts are not available on the keyboard or other medium used. In the same manner, ß can be transcribed as ss. Some operating systems use key sequences to extend the set of possible characters to include, amongst other things, umlauts; in Microsoft Windows this is done using Alt codes. German readers understand these transcriptions (although they appear unusual), but they are avoided if the regular umlauts are available, because they are a makeshift and not proper spelling. (In Westphalia and Schleswig-Holstein, city and family names exist where the extra e has a vowel lengthening effect, e.g. Raesfeld , Coesfeld  and Itzehoe , but this use of the letter e after a/o/u does not occur in the present-day spelling of words other than proper nouns.)

There is no general agreement on where letters with umlauts occur in the sorting sequence. Telephone directories treat them by replacing them with the base vowel followed by an e. Some dictionaries sort each umlauted vowel as a separate letter after the base vowel, but more commonly words with umlauts are ordered immediately after the same word without umlauts. As an example in a telephone book  occurs after  but before  (because Ä is replaced by Ae). In a dictionary  comes after , but in some dictionaries  and all other words starting with Ä may occur after all words starting with A. In some older dictionaries or indexes, initial Sch and St are treated as separate letters and are listed as separate entries after S, but they are usually treated as S+C+H and S+T.

Past

Until the early 20th century, German was printed in blackletter typefaces (in Fraktur, and in Schwabacher), and written in corresponding handwriting (for example Kurrent and Sütterlin). These variants of the Latin alphabet are very different from the serif or sans-serif Antiqua typefaces used today, and the handwritten forms in particular are difficult for the untrained to read. The printed forms, however, were claimed by some to be more readable when used for Germanic languages. The Nazis initially promoted Fraktur and Schwabacher because they were considered Aryan, but they abolished them in 1941, claiming that these letters were Jewish. It is believed that this script was banned during the Nazi régime, as they realized that Fraktur would inhibit communication in the territories occupied during World War II.

The Fraktur script however remains present in everyday life in pub signs, beer brands and other forms of advertisement, where it is used to convey a certain rusticality and antiquity.

A proper use of the long s, ſ, is essential for writing German text in Fraktur typefaces. Many Antiqua typefaces also include the long s. A specific set of rules applies for the use of long s in German text, but nowadays it is rarely used in Antiqua typesetting. One can easily decide which "s" to use by appropriate hyphenation, ( vs. ). The long s only appears in lower case.

Consonant shifts

German does not have any dental fricatives (as English th). The th sound, which the English language still has, disappeared on the continent in German with the consonant shifts between the 8th and 10th centuries.

Literature

The German language is used in German literature and can be traced back to the Middle Ages, with the most notable authors of the period being Walther von der Vogelweide and Wolfram von Eschenbach.
The , whose author remains unknown, is also an important work of the epoch. The fairy tales collected and published by Jacob and Wilhelm Grimm in the 19th century became famous throughout the world.

Reformer and theologian Martin Luther, who translated the Bible into High German, is widely credited for having set the basis for the modern Standard High German language. Among the best-known poets and authors in German are Lessing, Goethe, Schiller, Kleist, Hoffmann, Brecht, Heine and Kafka. Fourteen German-speaking people have won the Nobel Prize in literature: Theodor Mommsen, Rudolf Christoph Eucken, Paul von Heyse, Gerhart Hauptmann, Carl Spitteler, Thomas Mann, Nelly Sachs, Hermann Hesse, Heinrich Böll, Elias Canetti, Günter Grass, Elfriede Jelinek, Herta Müller and Peter Handke, making it the second-most awarded linguistic region (together with French) after English.

See also

 Outline of German language 
 Denglisch
 Deutsch (disambiguation)
 German family name etymology
 German toponymy
 Germanism (linguistics)
 German exonyms
 List of German expressions in English
 List of German words of French origin
 List of pseudo-German words in English
 List of terms used for Germans
 List of countries and territories where German is an official language
 Names for the German language
 DDR German

Notes

References

Bibliography

External links

 
 Dissemination of the German language in Europe around 1913 (map, 300 dpi)

 
Fusional languages
High German languages
Languages of Austria
Languages of Belgium
Languages of Germany
Languages of Liechtenstein
Languages of Luxembourg
Languages of Namibia
Languages of Switzerland
Languages of Trentino-Alto Adige/Südtirol
Stress-timed languages
Verb-second languages